William de Lindsay (died 1236), Lord of Luffness was a 12th-13th century Scottish noble.

Lindsay was a younger son of William de Lindsay and Aleanora de Limesay. He inherited the lordship of Luffness.

Marriage and issue 
He married Avice de Lancaster, daughter of Gilbert fitz Roger fitz Reinfried, they had the following known issue:
David de Lindsay of Luffness
William de Lindsay of Craigie

References
Mosley, Charles, editor. Burke's Peerage, Baronetage & Knightage, 107th edition, Volume 1. Wilmington, Delaware, U.S.A.: Burke's Peerage (Genealogical Books) Ltd, 2003.

Year of birth unknown
1236 deaths
12th-century Scottish people
13th-century Scottish people
Medieval Scottish knights
William